(We should praise Christ highly), 121, is a church cantata by Johann Sebastian Bach. He composed this Christmas cantata in Leipzig in 1724 for the second day of Christmas and first performed it on 26 December 1724. The chorale cantata is based on the hymn by Martin Luther "Christum wir sollen loben schon".

History and words 
Bach composed the cantata in his second year in Leipzig for the Second Day of Christmas. The prescribed readings for the feast day were from the Epistle to Titus, the Acts of the Apostles ( and ), and the Gospel of Luke.

The source for the melody is Martin Luther's setting of the hymn "Christum wir sollen loben schon", a German translation of the Latin "A solis ortus cardine" (c. 430). The opening chorus is its first verse and the closing chorale is its eighth verse, both unchanged. The hymn's other verses are freely adapted as madrigalian recitatives and arias by an unknown poet.

Scoring and structure 
The piece is scored for alto, tenor and bass vocal soloists with four-part choir. The instrumental parts are cornett, three trombones, oboe d'amore, two violins,  viola, and basso continuo.

The cantata has six movements:

 Chorus: Christum wir sollen loben schon
 Aria (tenor): O du von Gott erhöhte Kreatur
 Recitative (alto): Der Gnade unermesslich's Wesen
 Aria (bass): Johannis freudenvolles Springen
 Recitative (soprano): Doch wie erblickt es dich in deiner Krippe
 Chorale: Lob, Ehr und Dank sei dir gesagt

Music 

The opening choral motet is built on a quasi-church mode cantus firmus in the soprano, with an archaic effect underscored by a full four-part brass accompaniment. The instruments, other than the continuo, largely double the vocal lines; these and the continuo assume a contrapuntal role. Bach uses fugal techniques and an extended final cadence. It begins in E minor and, unusually, closes a tone higher in F-sharp minor.

The tenor aria is composed as a modern da capo aria, in which the symmetrical scheme is broken up by irregular periodising and harmonization. It includes a very prominent oboe d'amore part. The movement is largely in B minor. Craig Smith remarks that the aria is "marvelously off-kilter".

The third movement is an alto recitative. It ends with a "startling enharmonic progression – a symbolic transformation" to C major.

The bass aria is almost dance-like, playing with the harmony and portraying jumps, reflecting the movement's text's references to John the Baptist's leaping in his mother's womb during the Visitation of Mary. The binary-form string ritornello repeats four times during the aria, framing three separate vocal sections of the da capo aria.

The penultimate movement is a soprano recitative, short and arioso-like. It is remarkable for its extended range.

The closing chorale movement presents the doxology in a four-part setting, illuminating the early-church melody in a modern major-minor tonality. Unusually, the piece ends on a B minor imperfect cadence.

Recordings 
 Münchener Bach-Chor / Münchener Bach-Orchester, Karl Richter. Bach Cantatas Vol. 1. Arkiv Produktion, 1972.
 Gächinger Kantorei Stuttgart / Bach-Collegium Stuttgart, Helmuth Rilling. Die Bach Kantate. Hänssler, 1980.
 Monteverdi Choir / English Baroque Soloists, John Eliot Gardiner. J. S. Bach: Christmas Cantatas. Arkiv Produktion, 1998.
 Holland Boys Choir / Netherlands Bach Collegium, Pieter Jan Leusink. Bach Edition Vol. 14 – Cantatas Vol. 7. Brilliant Classics, 2000.
 Amsterdam Baroque Orchestra & Choir, Ton Koopman. J. S. Bach: Complete Cantatas  Vol. 12. Erato, 2000.
 Bach Collegium Japan, Masaaki Suzuki. J. S. Bach: Cantatas Vol. 31 – BWV 91, 101, 121, 133. BIS, 2004.

Notes

References

External links 
 
 Christum wir sollen loben schon BWV 121; BC A 13 / Chorale cantata (2nd Christmas Day): Leipzig University
 BWV 121 Christum wir sollen loben schon: English translation, University of Vermont
 Luke Dahn: BWV 121.6 bach-chorales.com

Church cantatas by Johann Sebastian Bach
1724 compositions
Christmas cantatas
Chorale cantatas